Kopřivnice is a town in the Moravian-Silesian Region of the Czech Republic. It has about 21,000 inhabitants. It is an industrial town, known especially for the vehicle manufacturer Tatra.

Administrative parts
Villages of Lubina, Mniší and Vlčovice are administrative parts of Kopřivnice.

Geography
Kopřivnice lies in the Moravian-Silesian Foothills. In the south it extends to the Podbeskydí Nature Park.

The town lies on the Kopřivnička Stream, a tributary of the Lubina River, which flows through the northern and eastern part of the territory.

Větřkovice Reservoir is located in the territory. Completed in 1976, it serves as a water supply for the Tatra Trucks company and the industrial zone, as a recreational area, and for fish farming.

History
The Šoštýn Castle was founded in around 1280–1290 and was first documented in 1347. The settlement was probably established soon after the castle. The first written mention of Kopřivnice is from 1437, when the castle and its surroundings were bought by Emperor Sigismund and joined to the Hukvaldy estate. In 1465, the estate was owned by King George of Poděbrady, who sold it a year later to Olomouc bishop Tas of Boskovice. Kopřivnice then became a property of the Olomouc bishopric.

For centuries, Kopřivnice remained only a village that did not escape the invasions of troops during the Thirty Years' War, natural disasters, crop failures, or epidemics. A turning point in the history of Kopřivnice was the establishment of a factory for earthenware in 1812. The factory gained fame throughout the whole Austria-Hungary with its products, and existed until 1962. The main driving force of industrialization was the carriage factory of Ignaz Schustala. In the early 20th century, the factory employed 5,000 workers, which forced the construction of additional residential houses. Thanks to the overall growth, Kopřivnice was promoted to a market town in 1910. 

Until 1918, Nesselsdorf – Kopřivnice  was part of the Austrian monarchy (Austria side after the compromise of 1867), in the Nový Jičín – Neutitschein District, one of the 34 administrative districts (Bezirkshauptmannschaften) in Moravia.

During the World War II, Kopřivnice was annexed by Nazi Germany. In 1945 the German population was expelled according to the Beneš Decrees. In 1948, Kopřivnice became a town.

In 1950, the municipalities of Drnholec nad Lubinou and Větřkovice merged and formed the municipality of Lubina. In 1979, Lubina was joined to Kopřivnice, Mniší and Vlčovice were joined in 1980. Závišice was a part of Kopřivnice from 1976 to 1990. In 1990, it became an independent municipality.

Demographics

Economy

Kopřivnice is known for the automotive and transportation industry, represented by the Tatra company. The company is one of the oldest manufacturers of vehicles with a continuous history in the world. In 1850, Ignaz Schustala started making here carriages, later the production of railway wagons was added. The first passenger car Präsident was manufactured in 1897, the first truck in 1898. After the World War II, trucks became the mainstay of production.

After restructuring in 2013, the company changed its name to Tatra Trucks. As of 2020, Tatra Truck employs more than 1,000 people. Tatra Metalurgie, a subsidiary focusing on foundry and forging, employs about 600 people.

There is also a large industrial zone with several major companies, mainly focused on production of automotive components. The largest employer of them is Brose CZ.

Sights

The Church of Saint Bartholomew is the landmark of the town. The neo-Gothic church was built in 1893–1894. Some of the works of art that adorn it come from the original old wooden church, which stood next to Fojtství (i.e. "Advocatus' residence").

Fojtství is the oldest preserved building in the town. The original wooden building from 1576 was rebuilt to its current form in 1789. It houses the Fojtství Museum that is dedicated to the history of the town. It also includes a barn, where Ignaz Schustala started making carriages and laid the foundation for the Tatra factory.

There are several museums that reflect the town's industrial tradition. The Tatra Technical Museum has a complete collection of Tatra passenger cars. The Oldtimer Kopřivnice Auto-Moto-Museum presents an exhibition of historic vehicles and motorcycles of famous brands from around the world.

The Tatra Trucks Museum, opened in 2021, presents an exposition of Tatra trucks. The museum also manages the depository of the Slovenská strela train. Slovenská strela is a unique train, the only movable national cultural monument in the Moravian-Silesian Region, manufactured in Kopřivnice in 1936. The building of the depository is an architecturally awarded Building of the Year 2021 of the Czech Republic. 

The Lachian Museum is located in the Schustala's villa. The villa was built in the Neoclassical style in 1889, for the local carriage factory owner Josef Schustala. The exposition of Dana and Emil Zátopek, who is among the most famous natives, is also located here.

Šostýn Castle is a Gothic castle from the late 13th century. The castle was conquered and destroyed in the 15th century. Today the ruin consists of the remains of a massive palace, two circuits of ramparts with moats, and the foundations of a cylindrical tower.

Notable people

Ignaz Schustala (1822–1881), entrepreneur and Tatra founder
Zdeněk Burian (1905–1981), painter
Zdeňka Veřmiřovská (1913–1997), gymnast
Emil Zátopek (1922–2000), athlete, Olympic medalist
Karel Loprais (1949–2021), rally raid driver; worked here
Hana Šromová (born 1978), tennis player
Tomáš Fleischmann (born 1984), ice hockey player
Patrik Bartošák (born 1993), ice hockey player
Adam Raška (born 2001), ice hockey player

Twin towns – sister cities

Kopřivnice is twinned with:
 Bánovce nad Bebravou, Slovakia
 Castiglione del Lago, Italy
 Myszków, Poland
 Trappes, France
 Zwönitz, Germany

References

External links

Regional tourist information portal

Cities and towns in the Czech Republic
Populated places in Nový Jičín District